Pilton may refer to:

Places
 Pilton, Queensland, Australia
 Pilton, Devon, England
 Pilton railway station
 Pilton, Northamptonshire, England
 Pilton, Rutland, England
 Pilton, Somerset, England
 Pilton, Edinburgh, Scotland

People 
 Barry Pilton (born 1946), British writer
 Simon Pilton (fl. 2009), British songwriter and record producer

Other uses
, wrecked in the Bristol Channel in 1924

See also

Piltdown